The Association of Confessional Lutheran Churches (ACLC) was established in the early part of the 21st century to meet the needs of Lutheran congregations that departed from the Evangelical Lutheran Synod when they considered a pastor to have been wrongly removed by that body.

Purpose
The root purpose of the ACLC, then, is to maintain a pool of pastors from which member congregations can call. There are two member churches.

Notes

External links
Association of Confessional Lutheran Churches Facebook Page

Lutheran denominations in North America